The 408th Rifle Division was formed as an infantry division of the Red Army, and served in that role for the duration of its existence in the Great Patriotic War. It was officially considered an Armenian National division, but in fact was made up of several other nationalities as well. After forming it remained in service in the Caucasus and Iran until the summer of 1942, when it was redeployed to help counter the German drive toward Tuapse. The 408th had a short and undistinguished career as a combat formation, and was soon disbanded.

Formation 
The 408th Rifle Division began forming on August 14, 1941, at Yerevan in the Transcaucasus Military District along with its "sister" 409th Rifle Division nearby. Its order of battle, based on the first wartime shtat (table of organization and equipment) for rifle divisions, was as follows:

 663rd Rifle Regiment
 670th Rifle Regiment
 672nd Rifle Regiment
 963rd Artillery Regiment
 195th Antitank Battalion
 191st Antiaircraft Battery (later 687th Antiaircraft Battalion)
 684th Mortar Battalion
 462nd Reconnaissance Company
 681st Sapper Battalion
 851st Signal Battalion
 485th Medical/Sanitation Battalion
 478th Chemical Protection (Anti-gas) Company
 343rd Motor Transport Company
 250th Field Bakery
 408th Divisional Veterinary Hospital
 1459th Field Postal Station
 730th Field Office of the State Bank
The division was officially named as an Armenian unit, but the reality was significantly different. At the time of its formation the breakdown of nationalities among its personnel was as follows:
 31% Russian and Ukrainian
 25% Georgian
 23% Azerbaijani
 21% Armenian
While the division was formed in Armenia, Armenian nationals were very much in the minority. For nearly the entire first year of its service, the 408th was in 45th Army along the border with Turkey and in the occupation force in Iran. It was commanded by Col. Pavel Nikolaievich Kitzuk throughout its existence; Maj. (later, Lt. Col.) Leonid Kolobov served as chief of staff from September, 1941 to August, 1942.

Combat service 
In July, 1942, the German 17th Army began an offensive through the passes of the Caucasus Mountains towards the Soviet ports along the eastern coast of the Black Sea, focusing on Tuapse. Given this threat, the 408th was redeployed in this direction and was split up. While the bulk of the division joined the Tuapse Defense Region, the 672nd Rifle Regiment was detached in September to the 47th Army defending the mountain passes north of the city. By September 23 the entire division formed this Army's reserve. During the following weeks the German XXXXIX Mountain Corps gradually forced its way southwards, making contact with the partly-isolated and under-supplied 408th on October 14. On the 21st, the German force launched an assault from the Gunaika River valley towards the villages of Goitkh and Georgievskoe. An intense artillery barrage destroyed the division's headquarters near Mount Semashkho, killing and wounding most of its staff. With command and control devastated, the defenses of the 408th, and the adjacent 107th Rifle Brigade, were shattered. The Germans captured Goitkh and encircled and destroyed most of the division, with just small groups able to break out and link up with the nearby 353rd and 383rd Rifle Divisions.

Following this debacle, the remnants of the division were drawn back to the Tuapse Defense Region. In an unusual decision, the remaining men and equipment of the 408th were distributed to other formations of the 47th Army, and the division was permanently disbanded on November 25.

References

Citations

Bibliography
  
  

408
Military units and formations established in 1941
Military units and formations disestablished in 1942
1941 establishments in the Soviet Union
1942 disestablishments in the Soviet Union